Communist Marxist Party (CMP) was a political party in Kerala. The party was founded in 1986 when CPI(M) leader M. V. Raghavan was expelled from the CPI(M) due to a grave difference of opinion regarding the formation of alliances with the IUML. His support for forming a united front with non-secular parties such as the Muslim League in order to take on alliances led by the INC was ultimately rejected by the CPI(M) leadership. He was subsequently expelled from the Party.

In 2011 assembly election of Kerala, CMP fielded three candidates but could not win any seat. CMP had links with the Party of Democratic Socialism of Saifuddin Chaudhury in West Bengal. M.V. Raghavan attended the PDS state conference in December 2003. CMP participated in the Confederation of Indian Communists and Democratic Socialists.

In the 2005 municipal elections in Kollam, the CMP candidate R. Vijayachandran won in the Asramam North constituency (defeating local RSP leader M.S. Babu).

Split 
In March 2014, the party split into two factions:
 CMP(A) led by K. R. Aravindakshan
 CMP(J) led by C. P. John

In 2019, some CMP(A) members joined CPI and some joined CPI(M). Now a fraction of CMP(A) is led by M. V. Rajesh and continue supporting the Left Democratic Front. CMP(J) support the United Democratic Front.

Mass organizations
All India Centre for Trade Unions (AICTU)
Kerala Socialist Youth Federation (KSYF)
State Employees and Teachers Federation (SETF)
Democratic Students Federation ( DSF )

Election results

Local elections in Kerala, 2015
Total for Kerala: Village Wards:16, Block Wards:4, District Wards:1, Municipality Wards:7 & Corporation Wards:3.

 Thiruvananthapuram District - Corporation Wards:3, Village Wards:0.
 Kannur District - No Representation
 Kollam District - Village Wards:5
 Alappuzha District - Block Wards:1, Municipality Wards:2.
 Idukki District - Village Wards:1
 Ernakulam District - Village Wards:2
 Thrissur District - Village Wards:2, District Wards:1 & Municipality Wards:5.
 Palakkad District - Village Wards:2
 Malappuram District - Village Wards:2, Block Wards:1.
 Wayanad District - Block Wards:1.
 Kasaragod District - Village Wards:1, Block Wards:1.

References

Political parties established in 1986
Political parties in Kerala
Communist parties in India
Communist Party of India (Marxist) breakaway groups
1986 establishments in Kerala